The Indian Journal of Pharmacology is a bimonthly peer-reviewed open-access medical journal published Medknow Publications on behalf of the Indian Pharmacological Society. It covers clinical and experimental pharmacology.

Abstracting and indexing 
The journal is abstracted and indexed in Abstracts on Hygiene and Communicable Diseases, Biological Abstracts, BIOSIS Previews, CAB Abstracts, Chemical Abstracts, EBSCO databases, Excerpta Medica/Embase, Global Health, PubMed, Science Citation Index Expanded, and Scopus.

References

External links 
 

Open access journals
Bimonthly journals
English-language journals
Medknow Publications academic journals
Pharmacology journals
Publications established in 1969
Academic journals associated with learned and professional societies of India